The 1994–95 season was the 49th season in FK Partizan's existence. This article shows player statistics and matches that the club played during the 1994–95 season.

Friendlies

Competitions

First League of FR Yugoslavia

FR Yugoslavia Cup

See also
 List of FK Partizan seasons

References

External links
 Official website
 Partizanopedia 1994-95  (in Serbian)

FK Partizan seasons
Partizan